"House Arrest" is the 18th episode in the third season of M*A*S*H. It originally broadcast on February 4, 1975.

Plot 
In the OR Margaret is not performing up to par and is continuously chided by Hawkeye.  Margaret admits that she is nervous about Colonel Reese, the most decorated nurse in the army, coming to the 4077th.

Outside the OR, when Hawkeye, Trapper, Margaret, and Frank are washing up after the shift, Hawkeye again tells Margaret that she should keep her head in the game.  Frank butts in and orders Hawkeye to "cease this harassing."  Trapper comes to Hawkeye's defense, and an argument erupts between the four of them.

Margaret employs Frank to defend her honor, so he nonchalantly hits Hawkeye with a towel.  Hawkeye pretends to wind up to return the hit with a towel slap of his own, only he punches Frank in the face.  Frank threatens a court-martial.

In Henry's office, the CO tries to convince Frank to drop the matter, but Frank persists.  Then Radar explains that if Hawkeye is court-martialled, then he will be placed on house arrest.  Hawkeye jumps at the opportunity for house arrest because it means he won't have to leave his tent, and instead can sleep and eat all day.

Meanwhile, Colonel Reese arrives and Margaret greets her.  Although tough, Colonel Reese isn't as uptight as Margaret, and even indicates that she doesn't have problems with a little doctor/nurse playtime with Hawkeye.

Frank discovers that Reese will be bunking with Margaret and he despairs at the thought of not being alone with Margaret for the duration of Reese's stay.

In Margaret's tent, Reese jovially questions Margaret on Frank and Margaret denies any "special relationship" between the two of them.

Back in Henry's office, Trapper relates his version of the incident concerning Frank and Hawkeye, only he recalls the story as Frank slipping on a bar of soap and hitting his face on the corner of the sink.  Klinger walks in, handing Radar a pair of pants that have been lengthened 3 inches.  When questioned, Radar quickly answers that he's chafing and the extra length on his pants will help alleviate this ailment.

In the Swamp, Hawkeye and Frank trade insulting banter as Hawkeye prepares for dinner by laying out a tablecloth and polishing a martini glass.  Trapper comes in bearing steak from the staff sergeant who was happy to hear that Hawkeye finally belted Frank.  Frank leaves in disgust and Father Mulcahy comes in, bringing a "Prisoner Of War" package for Hawkeye.

Father Mulcahy tells Hawkeye and Trapper that the next movie shown in camp will feature Gene Tierney, one of Hawkeye's favorite actresses, so the cooped-up Captain asks Father Mulcahy if anything can be done so that Hawkeye can see the film.

In Henry's office, Radar is on the phone trying to see what happened to the mail, which is 3 hours late.  Apparently he is expecting a special package.  After this, Henry calls him a "good little fella" upon departure.

Later that night, the Gene Tierney film (Leave Her to Heaven) is showing in the Swamp, so apparently Father Mulcahy pulled through.  Frank arrives on the scene and is noticeably upset that his quarters is overrun with picture patrons.

Back in Henry's office, we see what Radar has been waiting for:  shoes that make him taller.  Klinger, the ultimate high-heeled expert, helps Radar acquaint himself with the new footwear.  Frank comes in, demanding to know where Henry is, and notices that there's something new about Radar.  It's his glasses, he concludes.

Frank heads to Margaret's tent looking for sympathy. Reese greets him and proceeds to comfort and flirt with him.

Outside the swamp, Hawkeye steps out for a rest stop, with MPs in tow, and Radar crosses his path.  Immediately, Hawkeye realizes that Radar is inexplicably taller, and after apologizing for picking on the corporal, Hawkeye gives Radar a confidence boost, and Radar decides that the shoes were a bad move.

In Margaret's tent, Reese continues to try to put the moves on Frank, but he resists.  Just when he begins to give in, Margaret enters and Reese immediately starts shouting, "Rape, rape!"  Everyone in the camp rushes to the shouts and Reese accuses Frank of trying to pounce on her. Hawkeye refuses to share his house arrest with Frank, to which Margaret declares him innocent of punching Frank to begin with.

Of course, Frank himself is placed on house arrest, only his stay isn't so cheery, and the episode ends with Hawkeye (whose record is clean again, with some help from Margaret) annoyingly reminding Frank that he can't leave the Swamp.

Cast 

Alan Alda as Cpt. Hawkeye Pierce
Wayne Rogers as Cpt. Trapper John McIntyre
McLean Stevenson as Lt. Col. Henry Blake
Loretta Swit as Maj. Margaret "Hot Lips" Houlihan
Larry Linville as Maj. Frank Burns
Gary Burghoff as Cpl. Radar O'Reilly
William Christopher as Father Mulcahy
Mary Wickes as Col. Reese
Jamie Farr as Maxwell Klinger
Bobbie Mitchell as Nurse Baker
Jeff Maxwell as Igor Straminsky
Dennis Troy as the MP
Kellye Nakahara as Nurse Kellye

Written by Jim Fritzell and Everett Greenbaum.

Directed by Hy Averback.

External links

1975 American television episodes
M*A*S*H (season 3) episodes